Kiron Lenses were photographic lenses distributed by the Kiron Corporation, formerly based in Carson, California, United States.

History
The company was set up as a U.S. subsidiary of Kino Precision Industries Limited, Tokyo, Japan and registered as a trademark on Jan 25 1980, in order to market manually focused film camera optical lenses to the United States.  Kino Precision was founded in 1959 by Tatsuo Kataoka to manufacture lenses for 8mm movie cameras.

Originally, Kino Precision manufactured some of the now-famous Series 1 manual focus lenses under contract for Vivitar, a U.S. lens distributor of after-market film lenses for 35mm cameras.  However, after the positive reception from consumers on Vivitar Series 1 lenses, and as Vivitar was using other Japanese lens manufacturers to produce Vivitar brand lenses, the company believed the time was right to successfully market lenses to fit existing 35mm Japanese film cameras under their own brand, Kiron.  Kiron soon became known as one of the very few after-market lens manufacturers that could supply products equal to or even exceeding the optical and mechanical quality of the original manufacturer.  In particular, the Kiron 28mm/2.0, the 105mm/2.8 1:1 macro, the 28-210mm/4.0-5.6 and the 3.8-5.6 varifocal zoom, and the 28-85mm/2.8-3.8 varifocal macro zoom lenses were praised in contemporary reviews of the day for their superb optical resolution and clarity, as well as mechanical quality.
 
Although reasonably priced for the level of quality offered, Kiron manual focus lenses were never economy-level products, and were always made and assembled in Japan.  As such, Kiron lenses produced during the 1980s were normally priced only slightly below lenses offered by the camera manufacturers themselves.  Later, Vivitar itself would purchase some Kiron/Kino lens designs, (such as the Kiron 105mm f/2.8 macro lens, re-labeled as the Vivitar 100mm f/2.8 macro and the Vivitar 105mm/2.5 (1:1) macro lenses), and offered them for sale under the Vivitar brand. They begin with the serial number 22XXXXXX.

The increasing cost of quality lens manufacture in Japan led to a loss of sales for Kiron, as the company could no longer offer its lenses at a cost less than that charged by the camera manufacturers, who had begun to offer economy-level lens designs as well as contracting lens assembly operations in lower-cost factories outside Japan.  Additionally, the 35mm camera market was in flux by the late 1980s, and 35mm camera manufacturers were transitioning to autofocus lens designs.  By 1988, the company decided to discontinue after-market 35mm camera lens production to concentrate on industrial and other markets.

In 1989 Kino Precision Industries merged with 'Melles Griot Japan' to form 'Kino-Melles Griot'.

In 1995 the firm has changed its name to 'Melles Griot Ltd', and subsequently became a member of CVI Melles Griot Group in 2007.

In June 2011 Illinois-based IDEX Corporation completed its $400 million acquisition of the laser and optical component maker CVI Melles Griot from its previous owner, the private equity firm Norwest Equity Partners.

Types
Lenses for 35 mm film cameras:
 24mm 1:2.0
 28mm 1:2.0
 28mm 1:2.8
 28–70mm 1:3.5–4.5 (two versions)
 28–70mm 1:4.0
 28–85mm 1:2.8–3.8 varifocal macro zoom (aka "The Stovepipe")
 28–105mm 1:3.2–4.5 (two versions) varifocal zoom
 28-210mm 1:3.8-5.6 varifocal zoom (14 elements/11 groups) 
 28–210mm 1:4.0–5.6 varifocal zoom (14 elements/11 groups) 
 30–80mm 1:3.5–4.5 varifocal zoom
 35–135mm 1:3.5–4.5 varifocal zoom
 105mm 1:2.8 (macro 1:1)(6 elements/6 groups)
 70–150mm 1:4.0 
 70–210mm 1:4.0 (two versions)
 70–210mm 1:4.5
 80–200mm 1:4.0
 80–200mm 1:4.5 (six versions)

Lenses were made in the following lens mounts:
 Canon FD
 Konica AR
 Minolta SR
 Nikon F AI and AI-S
 Olympus OM
 Rolleiflex QBM
 Pentax K and KA
 Contax/Yashica

Not part of the original range but some lenses (28-210 and 70-210mm f/4.5) were also made available in M42 lens mount in the late 1980s.

References

See also
 Vivitar
 List of photographic equipment makers
 What do you think of KIRON lenses?
 Kiron in olypedia.de (extensive illustrated article in German)

Photography companies of the United States